The 2006–07 Vijay Hazare Trophy was the fifth season of the Vijay Hazare Trophy, a List A cricket tournament in India. It was contested between 27 domestic cricket teams of India, starting in February and finishing in March 2007. In the final, Mumbai beat Rajasthan by 72 runs to win their second title.

Group Matches
Central Zone

  Uttar Pradesh and Rajasthan qualified for the knockout stage.

East Zone

  Assam and Bengal qualified for the knockout stage.

North Zone

  Punjab and Delhi qualified for the knockout stage.

South Zone

  Karnataka and Tamil Nadu qualified for the knockout stage.

West Zone

  Maharashtra and Mumbai qualified for the knockout stage.

Knockout Matches

Preliminary Quarterfinal 1

Preliminary Quarterfinal 2

Quarterfinal 1

Quarterfinal 2

Quarterfinal 3

Quarterfinal 4

Semifinal 1

Semifinal 2

Final

References

External links
 Series home at ESPN Cricinfo

Vijay Hazare Trophy
Vijay Hazare Trophy